Jorge Enrique Robledo Castillo (born February 11, 1950) is a Colombian architect and politician currently serving as Senator. He has run for president of Columbia.

Biography 
Castillo was born February 11, 1950 in Ibagué, Tolima,Colombia. He became an architect and politician.

Political career 
Robledo is a member of the  political party. He was formerly a member of the Alternative Democratic Pole and was the Senate Leader for the party in congress. In his 4th term in office, Robledo received the highest vote of all Senators in the 2014 parliamentary elections (191,910 votes).

In October 2016, Robledo announced that he would run for president in 2018. He will be a candidate in the 2022 Presidential primary elections held by the Center Hope Coalition, vying to represent the Coalition in the first round of the Colombian Presidential general election.

Policies 
Senator Robledo is known for his economic nationalist policies and his persistent criticism of neoliberalism and the dependency on foreign investment as the main economic driver of economic growth. He has also focused heavily on national sovereignty, industrialization, workers' rights, and the improvement of healthcare. Robledo maintains strong relations with Colombia's agricultural interest groups. He is a critic of Colombia's free trade deals with respect to food security and agricultural production.

References

1950 births
Living people
Colombian politicians
People from Ibagué
University of Los Andes (Colombia) alumni
Economic nationalism
National liberalism
Left-wing nationalism